"Jerry Was a Man" (1947) is a short story by American writer Robert A. Heinlein. It is about an attempt by a genetically modified chimpanzee to achieve human rights. The main theme of the story is civil liberties, in this case extended towards a group of genetically enhanced chimpanzees to allow them equal rights under the law.

The story was originally published in Thrilling Wonder Stories, October 1947, and is collected in the book Assignment in Eternity.

TV version
"Jerry Was a Man" was adapted for television and aired as part of the anthology series Masters of Science Fiction, on U.S. network ABC during the summer of 2007.

The TV version has manufactured "anthropoid workers", produced through a combination of biological growth and engineering, ready made with some innate abilities and training to perform their allotted tasks. When the so-called "Joes" wore out or their jobs were completed, they were recycled into products such as dogfood.

Heinlein's original work depicted Jerry as an aging domestic worker, whereas the television version depicted Jerry as an explosive ordnance disposal technician or "minesweeper". In it, Jerry demonstrates his humanity to the court by singing the song "Old Folks at Home (Swanee River)", an old slave ballad, in front of the jury.  In the TV version, Jerry's level of self-awareness is minimal, but his lawyer demonstrates his humanity through three traits: first, his fondness for singing "Jingle Bells"; second, his ability to tell a lie in order to obtain a cigarette; third (and most significant) his sense of self-preservation, which is demonstrated through video footage of Jerry cutting away from where a mine is so a fellow minesweeper gets blown up instead.

See also

Les Animaux dénaturés by Jean Bruller.
Monkey selfie
Great ape personhood

References

External links

Short stories by Robert A. Heinlein
1947 short stories
Works originally published in Wonder Stories
Genetic engineering in fiction
Apes in popular culture